Westchester County, New York is located in southern New York, sharing its southern boundary with New York City and its northern border with Putnam County. It is bordered on the west side by the Hudson River and on the east side by the Long Island Sound and Fairfield County, Connecticut. The county has a total area of 500 square miles (1,300 km2), of which 430 square miles (1,100 km2) is land and 69 square miles (180 km2) (14%) is water. It is an area rich in biodiversity with many parks and preserves. Literary environmental writer Alex Shoumatoff hailed Westchester County as the "most richly diversified deciduous forest in the world" in a 1978 The New Yorker profile, at the time estimating that it contained 4,200 species of plants.

There are many natural areas that attract wildlife including Marshlands Conservancy and the Edith G. Read Wildlife Sanctuary, a 179-acre sanctuary along Long Island Sound migratory flyway. In winter months, the 85-acre lake hosts more than 5,000 ducks and was recognized by Audubon New York.

Plants
There are 1,168 species of vascular plants in Westchester County, according to the Parks Department.

Endangered plants:

Bog clubmoss Lycopodiella inundata
Netted chain fern Lorinseria areolata
Yellow harlequin Corydalis flavula
Spring avens Geum vernum
Winter grape Vitis vulpina
Tall thistle Cirsium altissimum
Purple everlasting Gnaphalium purpureum
Stiff-leaf goldenrod Solidago rigida
Bicknell's sedge Carex bicknellii
Soft fox sedge Carex conjuncta
Cat-tail sedge Carex typhina
Long-beaked bald rush Rhynchospora scirpoides
Large twayblade Liparis liliifolia

Threatened plants:

Purple milkweed Asclepias purpurascens
Swamp cottonwood Populus heterophylla
Rattlebox Crotalaria sagittalis
Swamp agrimony Agrimonia parviflora
Featherfoil Hottonia inflata
Slender pinweed Lechea tenuifolia
Shrubby St. Johnswort Hypericum prolificum
Mudwort Limosella australis
Winged monkeyflower Mimulus alatus
Slender saltmarsh aster Symphyotrichum tenuifolium
Spongy arrowhead Sagittaria montevidensis spongiosa
Strap-leaf arrowhead Sagittaria subulata
Spotted pondweed Potamogeton pulcher
Angled spikerush Eleocharis quadrangulata
Lesser bladderwort Utricularia minor
Yellow lady slipper Cypripedium parviflorum

Special concern plants:

Walking fern Asplenium rhizophyllum
Purple cliffbrake Pellaea atropurpurea
Eastern prickly pear Opuntia humifusa
Trailing arbutus Epigaea repens
Grass-of-Parnassus Parnassia glauca
Pitcher plant Sarracenia purpurea
Four-leaf milkweed Asclepias quadrifolia
River birch Betula nigra
Striped maple Acer pensylvanicum
American holly Ilex opaca
Prickly hornwort Ceratophyllum echinatum
Dittany Cunila origanoides
Stiff yellow flax Linum striatum
Wild pink Silene caroliniana
Blunt mountain mint Pycnanthemum muticum
Small floating bladderwort Utricularia radiata
Large yellow-eyed grass Xyris smalliana
Showy orchis Galearis spectabilis

Invasive plants: Invasive species pose a threat to biodiversity in Westchester County. In order to protect hundreds of species and wildlife, Westchester County has participated in gathering data about invasive plants through the Lower Hudson Partnership for Invasive Species Management (LHPRISM). The Cornell Cooperative Extension of Westchester is a resource for learning more about how to identify and map many of the species listed below.

Black jetbead Rhodotypos scandens
Burning bush Euonymus alatus
Chinese silver grass Miscanthus sinensis 
Chinese wisteria Wisteria sinensis
Garlic mustard Alliaria petiolata
Ground ivy Glechoma hederacea
Incised fumewort Corydalis incisa
Japanese Angelica tree Aralia elata
Japanese barberry Berberis thunbergii
Japanese knotweed Reynoutria japonica
Japanese stiltgrass Microstegium vimineum
Lesser celandine Ficaria verna
Mile-a-Minute Persicaria perfoliata
Mugwort Artemisia vulgaris
Multiflora Rose Rosa multiflora
Norway maple Acer platanoides
Oriental Bittersweet Celastrus orbiculatus
Pale swallow-wort Cynanchum rossicum
Porcelain-Berry Ampelopsis brevipedunculata
Princess tree, Empress tree Paulownia tomentosa
Tatarian Honeysuckle Lonicera tatarica
Tree of heaven Ailanthus altissima
Wineberry Rubus phoenicolasius

Birds
There are 311 species of birds in Westchester County, as documented by the Parks Department. The local Audubon Society chapter records 368 bird species.

Endangered birds:

Peregrine falcon Falco peregrinus
Loggerhead shrike Lanius ludovicianus
Least bittern Ixobrychus exilis
Bald eagle Haliaeetus leucocephalus
King rail Rallus elegans
Common tern Sterna hirundo
Henslow’s sparrow Ammodramus henslowii
Osprey Pandion haliaetus
Cooper’s hawk Accipiter cooperii
Northern goshawk Accipiter gentilis
Red-shouldered hawk Buteo lineatus
Golden-winged warbler Vermivora chrysoptera
Cerulean warbler Dendroica cerulea
Vesper sparrow Pooecetes gramineus
Grasshopper sparrow Ammodramus savannarum
Seaside sparrow Ammodramus maritimus
Savannah sparrow Passerculus sandwichensis
Kentucky warbler Oporornis formosus

Threatened birds:

Yellow-breasted chat Icteria virens
Common barn owl Tyto alba
Common raven Corvus corax
American woodcock Scolopax minor
Saltmarsh sharp-tailed sparrow Ammodramus caudacutus
Eastern meadowlark Sturnella magna
Bobolink Dolichonyx oryzivorus

Special Concern birds:

Common nighthawk Chordeiles minor
Whip-poor-will Caprimulgus vociferus
American black duck Anas rubripes
Wood thrush Hylocichla mustelina
Prairie warbler Dendroica discolor
Worm-eating warbler Helmitheros vermivorus
Canada warbler Wilsonia canadensis

Mammals
There are 33 species of mammals in Westchester County.

Special concern mammals:

River otter Lutra canadensis
Bobcat Lynx rufus

Reptiles
There are 19 species of reptiles in Westchester County.

Endangered reptiles:

Bog turtle Clemmys muhlenbergi
Wood turtle Clemmys insculpta
Timber rattlesnake Crotalus horridus

Threatened reptiles:

Spotted turtle Clemmys guttata
Eastern box turtle Terrapene carolina
Northern fence lizard Sceloporus undulatus
Eastern ribbon snake Thamnophis sauritus

Special concern reptiles:

Five-lined skink Eumeces fasciatus
Northern copperhead Agkistrodon contortrix
Eastern hognose snake Heterodon platyrhinos
Worm snake Carphophis amoenus

Insects

Butterflies
Endangered butterflies:

Aphrodyte Fritillary Speyeria aphrodite
Bronze Copper Lycaena hyllus
Leonard’s Skipper Hesperia leonardus
Regal Fritillary Speyeria idalia
Silver-bordered Fritillary Boloria selene
Two-spotted Skipper Euphyes bimacula
West Virginia White Pieris virginiensis

Threatened butterflies:

Silvery Checkerspot Chlosyne nycteis

Special concern butterflies:

Brown Elfin Callophrys augustinus
Dion Skipper Euphyes dion
Eyed Brown Satyrodes eurydice
Edward’s Hairstreak Satyrium edwardsii
Harris’ Checkerspot Chlosyne harrisii
Meadow Fritillary Boloria bellona

References

Westchester County, New York
Westchester County, New York
Westchester County, New York